Future Sicily (SF) is a regional political party active in Sicily, Italy, led by former minister Salvatore Cardinale, whose daughter Daniela Cardinale is a deputy of the Democratic Party (PD).

It was founded in October 2015 from the merger of the Pact of Democrats for Reforms with part of Democratic Sicily. and supported the regional government of the President of Sicily Rosario Crocetta. The party was initially called "Pact of Democrats for Reforms – Future Sicily" and subsequently rebranded only "Future Sicily".

In the 2016 local elections the party obtained substantial results in some medium-sized Sicilian cities: 15.8% in Favara, 14.5% in Canicattì, 14.1% in Barrafranca (where SD took 10.0%), and 9.3% in Alcamo.

In the 2017 regional election SF, in alliance with the Italian Socialist Party (PSI), obtained 6.0% of the vote and two seats in the Sicilian Regional Assembly.

In April 2019 the assembly of members of Sicilia Futura sanctioned the end of the alliance with the Democratic Party. Following this, the deputy Daniela Cardinale left the parliamentary group of the Democratic Party and switched to the Mixed Group.

References

External links
Official page – Sicilian Regional Assembly

Political parties in Sicily
Political parties established in 2015
2015 establishments in Italy